Aprionella unicolor is a species of beetle in the family Cerambycidae, and the only species in the genus Aprionella. It was described by Gilmour in 1959.

References

Batocerini
Beetles described in 1959
Monotypic Cerambycidae genera